Batter or batters may refer to:

Common meanings
 Batter (cooking), thin dough that can be easily poured into a pan
 Batter (baseball), person whose turn it is to face the pitcher
 Batter (cricket), a  player who is currently batting
 Batter (drum), a part of a snare drum
 Batter (crime), unlawful physical actions to a person
 Batter (tort), tort of bringing about an unconsented harmful or offensive contact with a person
 Batter (walls), an intentional slope of walls or earthworks

People
 Dave Batters (1969–2009), Canadian businessman and politician, husband of Denise
 Denise Batters (born 1970), Canadian politician, wife of Dave
 Doris Batter (1922–2002), British sprinter
 Elmer Batters (1919–1997), pioneer fetish photographer
 Jeff Batters (1970–1996), professional ice hockey player

Other uses
 BATTeRS, a Japanese project to find asteroids

See also

 
 Battered (disambiguation)
 Batter up (disambiguation)
 Batman (disambiguation)
 Batwoman (disambiguation)
 Batgirl (disambiguation)
 Bat boy (disambiguation)
 Bat (disambiguation)